Mallu Magalhães is a live DVD by Brazilian folk singer Mallu Magalhães that was released in Brazil on November 20, 2008

Track listing

DVD
"It Ain't Me Babe" (cover of Bob Dylan)
"Get to Denmark"
"Have You Ever"
"You Know You´ve Got"
"Meia Colorida"
"Vanguart"
"Her Day Will Come"
"It Takes Two to Tango"
"Girassóis"
"Folsom Prison Blues" (cover of Johnny Cash)
"Town of Rock and Roll"
"J1"
"Faz"
"O Preço da Flor"
"Noil"
"Sualk"
"Dry Freezing Tongue"
"I Do Believe"
"Angelina"
"Don't You Look Back"
"Tchubaruba"
"My Honey"
"You Always Say"
"Sweet Mom"

References

Mallu Magalhães video albums
2008 live albums
2008 video albums
Live video albums